Bilberry may also refer to:

 Bilberry, Cornwall, UK
 Bilberry Hill,  Worcestershire, UK
 Bilberry, the types of plants in the genus Vaccinium, bearing edible, nearly black berries.
 Bilberry goat, breed of feral goat
 Amelanchier canadensis, common names include bilberry and Canadian serviceberry

See also
 Blueberry (disambiguation)
 Blåbärssoppa, Scandinavian bilberry soup
 Bilberry soup (disambiguation)